Richard Phelan, D.D. (January 1, 1828 – December 20, 1904) was an Irish-born prelate of the Roman Catholic Church who served as the fourth bishop of the Diocese of Pittsburgh in Pennsylvania, in the United States from 1889 to 1904.

Biography

Early years 
Richard Phelan was born on January 1, 1828, in Sralee, near Ballyragget, County Kilkenny, Ireland, to Michael and Mary Keoghan Phelan. Of their nine children, four entered religious life. He was educated by private tutors, and at St Kieran's College in Kilkenny.

In 1850, as a seminarian, Phelan was recruited by Bishop Michael O'Connor of the Diocese of Pittsburgh, to serve in the United States. Once in Pennsylvania, Phelan continued his studies at the Seminary of St. Michael and after two years entered St. Mary's Theological Seminary in Baltimore, Maryland.

Priesthood 
Phelan was ordained a priest for the Diocese of Pittsburgh by Bishop Michael O'Connor in Pittsburgh on May 4, 1854. After his ordination, Phelan was assigned to a mission in Indiana County, Pennsylvania, but returned to Pittsburgh later that year to assist during a cholera epidemic. He served in the Pittsburgh area based out of Saint Paul Cathedral. One parish he visited was St. Michael the Archangel in Elizabeth.

After three years, Phelan was sent to Freeport, Pennsylvania, and in 1868, became pastor of St. Peter's Catholic Parish in Allegheny City, Pennsylvania. He built a new church at a cost exceeding $150,000. In 1876, this church became the pro-cathedral of the new diocese of Allegheny. He also completed the schools that his predecessor had begun. During the absence of Bishop John Tuigg in 1881, Phelan he was appointed administrator of the Dioceses of Pittsburgh and Allegheny, and he was subsequently made vicar-general.

Coadjutor Bishop and Bishop of Pittsburgh 
After Tuigg suffered a series of strokes, Pope Leo XIII on May 12, 1885, appointed Phelan as coadjutor bishop of the Diocese of Pittsburgh and titular bishop of Cibyra. On August 2, 1885, he was consecrated by Archbishop Patrick John Ryan. At that point, he handled the actual administration of the diocese, but continued to reside in Allegheny.  On 1 July 1889, the Diocese of Allegheny was totally suppressed and folded into the Diocese of Pittsburgh.

The people of many nationalities who were coming in large numbers to find work in the mines and mills of Western Pennsylvania were formed into regular congregations, supplied with pastors who could speak their own languages. In May, 1901, the counties of Cambria, Blair, Bedford, Huntingdon, and Somerset were taken from the Diocese of Pittsburg to form, with several counties from the Diocese of Harrisburg, the new Diocese of Altoona. Phelan automatically became bishop of Pittsburgh upon the death of Bishop Tuigg on December 7, 1889.

Richard Phelan died on December 20, 1904, at age 76, at St. Paul's Orphan Asylum in Pittsburgh. He was buried in St. Mary Cemetery in the city's Lawrenceville neighborhood.

References

Sources

External links 
 Roman Catholic Diocese of Pittsburgh History of Bishops webpage
 Photos of Phelan's tombstone and inscription

1828 births
1904 deaths
People from County Kilkenny
Irish emigrants to the United States (before 1923)
St. Mary's Seminary and University alumni
Roman Catholic bishops of Pittsburgh
19th-century Roman Catholic bishops in the United States
20th-century Roman Catholic bishops in the United States
American Roman Catholic clergy of Irish descent